The Accademia Carrara, , officially Accademia Carrara di Belle Arti di Bergamo, is an art gallery and an academy of fine arts in Bergamo,  in Lombardy in northern Italy. The academy of fine arts was added to it in 1794. The school was recognised by the Ministero dell'Istruzione, dell'Università e della Ricerca, the Italian ministry of education, in 1988.

History 

An academy of fine arts was added to it in 1793 or 1794, initially under the direction of the Milanese painter Carlo Dionigi Sadis.

Carrara made his will in 1795, leaving his entire estate to the gallery and art school he had founded; these were to be managed by a five-member commission, of which the first five were chosen by him. He died the next year. 

In 1810, a new building in the neoclassical style was constructed, the project being undertaken by the architect Simone Elia, a pupil of Leopoldo Pollack.

In 1958 the Comune di Bergamo took over the management of the gallery and school. In 1988 the school was recognised by the Ministero dell'Istruzione, dell'Università e della Ricerca, the Italian ministry of education, and came under the administration of that ministry.

Directors-general
The directors-general at the Accademia Carrara have been, in chronological order, Giuseppe Diotti, Enrico Scuri, Cesare Tallone, Ponziano Loverini, Luigi Brignoli, Achille Funi, Trento Longaretti, Pierluigi De Vecchi, Mario Cresci and Maria Grazia Recanati.

See also
 Catalogue of the Pinacoteca of the Accademia Carrara
 List of academies of fine art in Italy
https://www.lacarrara.it/visita/servizi/app/

References 

 
Art schools in Italy
Art museums and galleries in Lombardy
Museums in Bergamo
1793 establishments in Italy
Art museums established in 1793